Halford is an American heavy metal band formed in 1999 by British singer Rob Halford, who is best known as the lead vocalist for heavy metal band Judas Priest. Halford formed the band to return to his heavy metal roots. His two previous projects were a "street metal"-style band called Fight and the industrial metal band 2wo.

Recordings
Halford's first album, Resurrection, was released in 2000 to critical acclaim. It was subsequently included in Martin Popoff's The Top 500 Heavy Metal Albums of All Time. In addition, the songs "Silent Screams" and the title-track "Resurrection" were included in Popoff's list. The track "The One You Love to Hate" featured vocalist Bruce Dickinson of metal band Iron Maiden.

In 2002, Halford released its second studio album Crucible. Although no live recordings have been officially released to promote this album, a high-quality soundboard bootleg titled Live: From the Disney House of Blues, was made available for download at robhalford.com in 2004. Halford released bonus tracks in Japan, such as "She", "Fugitive", "Rock the World Forever", and "In the Morning".

In November 2006, Halford released a single titled "Forgotten Generation". The first wave of Halford re-releases included remastered editions of the band's back catalog, initially released through the iTunes Store. Fight also released an early recording entitled K5 – The War of Words Demos, dating back to the formation of Fight. The compilation Metal God Essentials Vol. 1 not only included the fans' favorite Halford songs, but also the new recordings "Forgotten Generation" and "Drop Out".

Halford's third record, Halford III: Winter Songs, was released on November 3, 2009. The record features tracks recorded between 2008–2009, as well as traditional Christmas songs re-arranged to heavy metal renditions by Rob Halford himself. The first single "Get Into the Spirit" was released to radios on September 29, 2009.
On June 25, 2010, Halford released "The Mower", the first single from the studio album Halford IV: Made of Metal, which was released in September 2010.

Band members

Current
 Rob Halford - vocals (1999–present)
 Mike Chlasciak - guitars (1999–present)
 Bobby Jarzombek - drums (2000–present)
 Mike Davis - bass (2003–present)
 Roy Z - guitars (2003–present)

Former
 Ray Riendeau - bass (1999–2002)
 Pete Parada - drums (1999–2000)
 Patrick Lachman - guitars (1999–2002)
 Chad Tarrington - guitars (2003)
 Jason Ward - bass (2003)

Timeline

Discography 

 Resurrection (2000)
 Crucible (2002)
 Halford III: Winter Songs (2009)
 Halford IV: Made of Metal (2010)

References

Heavy metal musical groups from Arizona
Musical groups established in 1999
Judas Priest
Musical quintets
Musical groups from Phoenix, Arizona
1999 establishments in Arizona
Sanctuary Records artists